This is a list of Hungarians notable within Hungary and/or abroad. It includes notable Hungarians born outside present-day Hungary.

Architects

Artists

Gyula Aggházy
Károly Antal
Franz Liszt
Miklós Borsos
Sándor Bortnyik
Francois Colos
Tivadar Csontváry Kosztka
Gyula Donáth
Orshi Drozdik
János Fadrusz
Béni Ferenczy
István Ferenczy
Arpad Feszty
Simon Hantaï
János Horvay
László Hudec
Miklós Izsó
Zoltán Joó
Ede Kallós
André Kertész
Zsigmond Kisfaludi Stróbl
Márta Lacza
Paul László
Philip de László
Miklós Ligeti
Imre Makovecz
János Major
Zsuzsa Máthé
David Merlini
László Moholy-Nagy
István Orosz
János Pásztor
József Róna
Albert Schickedanz
Henriett Seth-F.
Pal Szinyei Merse
László Szlávics, Jr.
Adam Szentpétery
Mór Than
János Tornyai
Lajos Vajda
Victor Vasarely
János Vaszary
Nándor Wagner
Marika Száraz

Aviators

World War I aviators

World War II aviators

Business professionals
Lea Gottlieb (1918–2012), Israeli fashion designer and founder of Gottex
Andrew Grove, pioneer in the semiconductor industry; a chairman and CEO of Intel
Radovan Jelašić, governor of the National Bank of Serbia
Peter Munk, Canadian-Hungarian entrepreneur, founder of Barrick Gold, and philanthropist 
Tibor Rosenbaum, businessman 
George Soros, Hungarian-American business magnate, investor, philosopher and philanthropist

Composers and performers

Bálint Bakfark, composer
Kristóf Baráti, violinist
Béla Bartók, composer and pianist
János Bihari, violinist 
Gergely Bogányi, pianist
Attila Csihar, vocalist
György Cziffra, pianist and composer
Ernő Dohnányi (Ernst von Dohnanyi), composer, pianist and conductor
Antal Doráti, conductor
Péter Eötvös, composer and conductor
Ferenc Erkel, composer
László Fassang, organist and pianist 
Iván Fischer, conductor and composer
Peter Frankl, pianist
Endre Granat, violinist
Zoltán Jeney, composer
Joseph Joachim, violinist
Pál Kadosa, composer
Zoltán Kocsis, pianist and conductor
Zoltán Kodály, composer
Rezső Kókai, composer
György Kurtág, composer
Franz Lehár, composer
György Ligeti, composer
Franz Liszt, composer and pianist
Éva Marton, soprano
Ilona Náday, singer
János Négyesy, violinist
Ervin Nyiregyházi, pianist
Eugene Ormandy, conductor
Veronika Harcsa, vocalist
György Pauk, violinist
László Polgár, bass
Fritz Reiner, conductor
Eduard Reményi, violinist
Rezső Seress, composer and pianist
Georg Solti, conductor
Gábor Szabó, guitarist
Georg Szell, conductor
Júlia Várady, soprano
Ibolya Verebics, soprano 
László Vidovszky, composer
Andras Schiff, pianist
James Nemeti Stamp JLR Technician

See more in List of Hungarian composers.

Film artists

Drew Barrymore, Hungarian mother
Cicciolina
Michael Curtiz
Attila Dargay
Eva Gabor
Zsa Zsa Gabor
John Garfield
Harry Houdini
Miklós Jancsó
Gyula Kabos
Lajos Koltai
Róbert Koltai
Sir Alexander Korda
László Kovács
Peter Lorre
Jon Lovitz (of Hungarian descent)
Béla Lugosi
Paul Lukas
Károly Makk
George Pal
Gabriel Pascal
Gábor Reviczky
Ferenc Rofusz
István Szabó
Béla Tarr
Andrew G. Vajna
Johnny Weissmuller
Vilmos Zsigmond
László Nemes

History and politics

Viktor Orbán (born 1963), current Prime Minister of Hungary (1998–2002, 2010–present)
László Almásy (1895–1951), desert explorer, author, the inspiration for the fictionalised character of Almásy in Michael Ondaatje's 1992 novel The English Patient
Gyula Andrássy (1823–1890), statesman
József Antall (1932–1993), Prime Minister of Hungary (1990–1993)
Albert Apponyi (1846–1933), statesman
Tamás Bakócz (1442–1521), archbishop, cardinal and statesman
Gábor Baross (1848–1892), statesman
Erzsébet Báthory (1560–1614), countess
István Báthory (1477–1534), Governor of Transylvania
István (Stephen) Báthory (1533–1586), Prince of Transylvania and King of Poland
Zsigmond Báthory (1572–1613), Prince of Transylvania
Ödön Beöthy (1796–1854), Hungarian deputy and orator
Béla Bugár (born 1958), politician
Pál Csáky (born 1956), politician
Aurél Dessewffy (1808–1842), journalist and politician
Péter Doszpot (born 1962), former member of parliament
Ignaz Aurelius Fessler (1756–1839), court councillor and minister to Alexander I of Russia
Catharina Anna Grandon de Hochepied (1767–1803), noble and amateur actress 
András Hadik (1710–1790), Count
Theodor Herzl (Tivadar Herzl, 1860–1904), journalist, modern Zionism
Miklós Horthy (1868–1957), admiral and regent (1920–1944)
Stephen I of Hungary (Stephen I, Szent István, Stephanus Rex, I. István) (975–1038) first King of Hungary
Friar Julian
János Kádár (1912–1989), communist leader
Charles I of Hungary (Károly Róbert) (1288–1342), King of Hungary (1308–1342)
Mihály Károlyi (1875–1955), first President of Hungary (1919)
Lajos Kossuth (1802–1894), Hungarian politician later Regent-President of Hungary
Teddy Kollek (born Tivadar Kollek, 1911–2007), Israeli Mayor of Jerusalem
Béla Kun (1886–1938), minister, revolutionist (1919)
Louis I of Hungary (Louis I, Nagy Lajos, 1326–1382), king of Hungary (1342–1382)
Tom Lantos (1928–2008), former U.S. Congressman from California
Géza Malasits (1874–1948), deputy in parliament 
József Mindszenty (1892–1975), cardinal, imprisoned by communist government
Imre Nagy (1896–1958), prime minister in 1953 and 1956
Ágnes Osztolykán (born 1974), Hungarian politician and Romani activist 
Mátyás Rákosi (1892–1971), communist leader
George Soros (György Soros, born 1930), stock investor, philanthropist, and political activist
Ferenc Szálasi (1897–1946), head of Arrow Cross Party, Head of State, Prime Minister of Hungary (1944–1945)
László Szalay (1813–1864), statesman and historian
Count Széchenyi István (1791–1860)
Istvan Tisza (1861–1918), Prime Minister of Hungary (1903–1905; 1913–1917)
Toma András (Tamás András), Hungarian World War II prisoner found in Russian mental hospital and returned after 55 years
László Tőkés (born 1952), Reformed Church pastor and an instigator of the Romanian Revolution of 1989
Count Zrínyi Miklós (1508–1566), Hungarian general who held Szigetvár against the Ottoman Turks
Count Zrínyi Miklós (1620–1664), Hungarian general, statesman and poet
János Zsámboky, humanist

Inventors

Ferenc Anisits, inventor of the BMW diesel engine (1983)
Oszkár Asbóth, inventor of helicopter (1928)
Donát Bánki, inventor of the cross-flow turbine
Béla Barényi, inventor in field of automobile safety
László Bíró, inventor of the ballpoint pen (1931)
Ottó Bláthy, inventor of the voltage regulator, co-inventor (with Miksa Déri and Károly Zipernowsky) of the transformer
János Csonka, inventor of the carburetor
Miksa Déri, co-inventor (with Ottó Bláthy and Károly Zipernowsky) of the transformer
Dénes Gábor, inventor of holography (1947)
József Galamb, creator of the Ford Model T (1908)
Csaba Horváth, inventor of the high-performance liquid chromatography
János Irinyi, inventor of noiseless match (1836)
Ányos Jedlik, co-inventor of dynamo (1861) and soda water (1826)
Rudolf E. Kálmán, co-inventor of the Kalman filter
Kálmán Kandó, pioneer in the development of railway electric traction
Dénes Mihály, inventor of television technology
Joseph Petzval, mathematician, inventor, and physicist.
Tivadar Puskás, inventor of the telephone exchange
Ernő Rubik, inventor of the Rubik's Cube (1976)
Kálmán Tihanyi, inventor of cathode ray tubes, inventor of the first manless aircraft in Great Britain
Károly Zipernowsky, co-inventor (with Ottó Bláthy and Miksa Déri) of the transformer

Religion

Scientists

Avram Hershko (born 1937 as Herskó Ferenc), Hungarian-born Israeli biochemist and Nobel laureate in Chemistry (2004)
András Arató, award-winning electrical engineer known for the Hide the Pain Harold meme
Erzsébet Bajári (1912–1963)
György Bálint (originally surname Braun; 1919–2020), Hungarian horticulturist, Candidate of Agricultural Sciences, journalist, author, and politician who served as an MP.
Robert Bárány
Zoltán Bay
George von Békésy Nobel Prize
Gergely Berzeviczy
Farkas Bolyai
János Bolyai
Imre Bródy
George de Hevesy
Loránd Eötvös
Paul Erdős
Dennis Gabor
Zoltan Hajos
Máté Hidvégi
Johann Baptiste Horvath
Vilma Hugonnai
János Kornai
Géza Krepuska, ear, nose, and throat specialist
Cornelius Lanczos
George Andrew Olah
Rózsa Péter
Thomas Sebeok
Pál Selényi
Ignaz Semmelweis, physician and pioneer of antiseptic procedures
Charles Simonyi (Karoly)
Michael Somogyi
Victor Szebehely
Albert Szent-Györgyi, discovered vitamin C (1932)
Leó Szilárd
Valentine Telegdi
Mária Telkes
Edward Teller
Franz Nopcsa von Felso-Szilvas
Georg von Békésy
Theodore von Kármán
John von Neumann
József Szabó de Szentmiklós
Eugene Wigner
Richard Adolf Zsigmondy

Sports

Robert Antal (1921–1995), Olympic champion water polo player
Péter Bakonyi (born 1938), saber fencer, twice Olympic bronze
Gedeon Barcza (1911–1986), chess player
Viktor Barna (born Győző Braun) (1911–1972), 22-time world champion table tennis player, International Table Tennis Foundation Hall of Fame
István Barta (1895–1948), Olympic champion water polo player, silver
Zsolt Baumgartner (born 1981), Formula One racecar driver (2003–2004), Jordan-Ford (two races, subbing for injured Ralph Firman) (2003), Minardi-Cosworth (2004), all 18 Grand Prix, 1 point (United States Grand Prix in Indianapolis, Indiana)
Laszlo Bellak (1911–2006), seven-time world champion table tennis player, ITTFHoF
Tibor Benedek (born 1972), water polo player, Olympic champion: 2000 Summer Olympics (Sydney), 2004 Summer Olympics (Athens), 2008 Summer Olympics (Beijing)
Pál Benkő (1928–2019), chess player
Gyula Bíró (1890–1961), midfield and forward footballer (national team)
László Bita (born 1967), footballer
Balázs Borbély (born 1979), footballer
József Braun (also known as József Barna; 1901–1943), Olympic footballer 
Gyula Breyer (1894–1921), chess player
György Bródy (1908–1967), water polo goalkeeper, two-time Olympic champion
Ákos Buzsáky (born 1982), football player
Ibolya Csák, winner of women's high jump at the 1936 Summer Olympics
Zoltán Czibor (1929–1997), soccer player
Tamás Darnyi, swimmer (four Olympic gold medals)
Krisztina Egerszegi, swimmer (five Olympic gold medals)
Ilona Elek (née "Schacherer"; 1907–1988), foil fencer (Olympic gold-medal winner, and world champion, both before and after World War II)
Árpád Élő, (1903–1992), Hungarian-born American creator of the chess Elo rating system
Zsolt Erdei, boxer, WBO light heavyweight world champion
Sándor Erdős (born 1947), épée fencer, Olympic champion
Dr. Dezső Földes (1880–1950), saber fencer, two-time Olympic champion
Samu Fóti, Olympic silver (gymnastics team combined exercises)
Dr. Jenő Fuchs (1882–1955), saber fencer, four-time Olympic champion
Tamás Gábor (1932–2007), épée fencer, Olympic champion
János Garay (1889–1945), saber fencer, Olympic champion, silver, bronze, killed in the Holocaust
György Gedó (born 1949), Olympic champion light flyweight boxer
Sándor Gellér (1925–1996), soccer goalkeeper, Olympic champion
Imre Gellért, Olympic silver-medal winner (gymnastics team combined exercises)
Zoltán Gera, soccer player; has played for Ferencváros, West Bromwich Albion and Fulham
Dr. Oskar Gerde (1883–1944), saber fencer, two-time Olympic champion, killed in the Holocaust
Aladár Gerevich, fencer, seven Olympic gold medals
Charlie Gogolak (born 1944), American football number-one draft pick of the Washington Redskins
Péter Gogolak (born 1942), American football; invented "soccer style" kicking; played for the New York Giants and the Buffalo Bills
Dr. Sándor Gombos (1895–1968), saber fencer, Olympic champion
Gyula Grosics, goalkeeper for Golden Magyar soccer team undefeated from 1950 to 1954
Béla Guttmann (1900–1981), midfielder, national team football player, international coach; forced laborer in the Holocaust
Andrea Gyarmati, Olympic swimmer silver (100-meter backstroke) and bronze (100-meter butterfly); world championships bronze (200-meter backstroke), International Swimming Hall of Fame
Dezső Gyarmati, water polo player (triple Olympic champion)
Alfréd Hajós (born Arnold Guttmann; 1878–1955), swimmer three-time Olympic champion (100-meter freestyle, 800-meter freestyle relay, 1,500-meter freestyle), International Swimming Hall of Fame
Mickey Hargitay, bodybuilder and actor
Nándor Hidegkuti (1922–2002), soccer player
Endre Kabos (1906–1944), saber fencer, three-time Olympic champion, bronze; killed while a forced laborer in the Holocaust
Garry Kallos (born 1956), Hungarian-born Canadian wrestler and sambo competitor
Béla Károlyi (born 1942), premier gymnastics coach (ethnic Hungarian, lived in Romania, now a US citizen)
Károly Kárpáti (also known as Károly Kellner), Olympic champion wrestler (freestyle lightweight), silver
Ágnes Keleti (born 1921), five-time Olympic gymnastics champion
Adolf Kertész (1892–1920), footballer
Gyula Kertész (1888–1982), footballer
Vilmos Kertész (1890–1962), footballer
Kincsem (1874–1887), most successful racehorse in world history
Sándor Kocsis (1929–1979), soccer player
Zsuzsa Körmöczy, tennis player, world #2, won 1958 French Open Singles
István "Koko" Kovács, boxer, Olympic champion and WBO world champion
Pál Kovács, fencer, six Olympic gold medals
Lily Kronberger (1890–1974), four-time world figure skating champion, two-time bronze, World Figure Skating Hall of Fame
Péter Lékó (born 1979), chess player
Imi Lichtenfeld, boxer and wrestler, developed the self-defense system Krav Maga
Andor Lilienthal (1911–2010), chess player
Johann Löwenthal (1810–1876), chess player
Zoltán Magyar (born 1953), twice Olympic pommel horse gold medalist
Gyula Mándi (1899–1969), half back Olympic footballer (player and coach of national teams)
Géza Maróczy (1870–1951), chess player
Opika von Méray Horváth, three-time world figure-skating champion
József Munk, Olympic silver swimmer (4x200-meter freestyle relay)
Nickolas Muray (born Miklós Mandl; 1892–1965), Hungarian-born American photographer and Olympic fencer
Les Murray (born 1945 as László Ürge), Australian soccer broadcaster, sports journalist and analyst
Henrik Nádler (1901–1944), international footballer
Henrietta Ónodi, Olympic medal-winning gymnast (won gold, silver at Barcelona in 1992)
Árpád Orbán (1938–2008), Olympic champion footballer
László Papp, boxer (three-time Olympic champion)
Attila Petschauer (1904–1943), sabre fencer, two-time team Olympic champion, silver; killed in the Holocaust
Anna Pfeffer (born 1946), Olympic medalist sprint canoeist
Judit Polgár (born 1976), chess player
Zsófia Polgár (born 1974), chess player
Zsuzsa Polgár (born 1969), chess player
Imre Polyák, Olympic and World Champion Greco-Roman wrestler
Lajos Portisch (born 1937), chess player
Ferenc Puskás (1927–2006), football (soccer) player
Béla Rajki-Reich (1909–2000), swimming coach and water polo coach
Emília Rotter, pair skater, World Championship four-time gold, silver, Olympic two-times bronze
Miklós Sárkány, two-time Olympic champion water polo player
Zoltán Ozoray Schenker (1880–1966), saber fencer, Olympic champion
Gusztáv Sebes (1906–1986), Hungarian national soccer coach
Anna Sipos, 11-time world champion table tennis player, ITTFHoF
Tamás Sipos, sports commentator and writer, former director of Hungarian television
László Szabados, Olympic bronze swimmer (4 x 200-meter freestyle relay)
Miklós Szabados, 15-times world champion table tennis player
László Szabó (1917–1998), chess player
Ágnes Szávay (born 1988), tennis player
András Székely (1909–1943), Olympic silver swimmer (200-meter breaststroke) and bronze (4 x 200-meter freestyle relay)
Éva Székely (born 1927), Olympic champion and silver swimmer (200-meter breaststroke); International Swimming Hall of Fame; mother of Andrea Gyarmati
László Szollás (1907–1980), pair skater, World Championship four-time gold, silver, Olympic two-times bronze
Gábor Talmácsi (born 1981), 125 cc MotoGP World Champion
Imre Taussig (1894–1945), Hungarian footballer 
Judit Temes (1930–2013), Olympic champion swimmer (4×100-meter freestyle), bronze (100-meter freestyle)
Ildikó Újlaky-Rejtő (born 1937), foil fencer, two-time Olympic champion, world champion
Antal Vágó (1891–1944), footballer
Márton Vas (born 1980), ice hockey player
Árpád Weisz (1896–1944), Olympic football player and manager
Richárd Weisz, Olympic champion wrestler (Greco-Roman super heavyweight)
Lajos Werkner (1883–1943), saber fencer, two-time Olympic champion
George Worth, born György Woittitz (1915–2006), American Olympic saber fencer
Imre Zachár, Olympic silver swimmer (4x200-meter freestyle relay)
Dominik Szoboszlai, Hungarian professional footballer

Writers

András Dugonics
Endre Ady
János Arany
Mihály Babits
Bálint Balassi
János Batsányi
Elek Benedek
Dániel Berzsenyi
Mihály Csokonai Vitéz
Péter Esterházy
Mihály Fazekas
András Fáy
Géza Gárdonyi
István Gyöngyösi
Géza Gyóni
Mór Jókai
Attila József
Kálmán Kalocsay
József Kármán
Lajos Kassák
József Katona
Ferenc Kazinczy
Zsigmond Kemény
Andrew Karpati Kennedy
Imre Kertész, winner of the Nobel Prize in Literature
Sándor Kisfaludy
Ferenc Kölcsey
László Krasznahorkai, winner of the Man Booker International Prize
Menyhért Lakatos
György Lukács
Imre Madách
Sándor Márai
Ferenc Molnár
Ferenc Móra
Zsigmond Móricz
András Petőcz
Sándor Petőfi
Miklós Radnóti
Agnes Rapai
Jenő Rejtő
Istvan Rozanich
András Sütő
Lőrinc Szabó
Magda Szabó
Róbert Tábori
Sebestyén Tinódi Lantos
Árpád Tóth
János Vajda
József Vészi
Mihály Vörösmarty
Albert Wass
Miklós Zrínyi
Simon Kézai

List of Hungarians who were born outside present-day Hungary
The borders of Hungary have changed substantially in the past century. Many places once part of Hungary now belong to neighboring countries. The list is organised by country of birth and those listed have the name of their birthplace (in parentheses) as it is currently named.

Austria

Burgenland
See also category in the German Wikipedia:  Person (Burgenland).

Robert Bárány (Vienna) – otologist
Pál Kitaibel (Mattersburg)  – chemist and botanist
Ferenc Liszt (Raiding)  – composer

Czechoslovakia
Koloman Gögh (Kladno) – football player

Romania

Endre Ady (Érmindszent/Mecenţiu) – poet
Mariska Ady (Hadad/Hodod) – poet
János Apáczai Csere (Apáca/Apața) – educator
Lajos Áprily (Braşov) – poet
János Arany (Salonta) – poet
Albert-László Barabási (Cârţa) – physicist
Béla Bartók (Sânnicolau Mare) – composer
István Báthory (Șimleu Silvaniei) – captain and governor
Elek Benedek (Băţanii Mici) – collector of folk tales
Gábor Bethlen (Ilia) – captain and governor
István Bocskai (Cluj-Napoca) – captain and governor
Farkas Bolyai (Buia) – mathematician
János Bolyai (Cluj-Napoca) – mathematician
Matthias Corvinus (Cluj-Napoca) – perhaps the most famous King of Hungary
György Dózsa (Dalnic) – leader of a peasant revolt
Jenő Dsida (Satu Mare)  – poet
André François (Timișoara) – painter and graphic artist
Margit Kaffka (Carei) – poet and novelist
Sándor Kányádi (Porumbenii Mari) – poet
Ferenc Kazinczy (Şimian) – poet and language reformer
Károly Kós (Timișoara) – architect
Ferenc Kölcsey (Satu Mare) – poet; author of the national anthem
Sándor Kőrösi Csoma (Chiuruş) – orientologist
Béla Kun (Cehu Silvaniei) – politician
György Kurtág (Lugoj) – composer
György Ligeti (Târnăveni) – composer
Bela Lugosi (Lugoj) – actor
Kelemen Mikes (Zagon) – writer
Balázs Orbán (Polonița) – writer, historian and politician
Péter Pázmány (Oradea) – theologian and writer
Sándor Reményik (Cluj-Napoca) – poet
András Sütő (Cămărașu) – writer
Áron Tamási (Lupeni) – writer
Sámuel Teleki (Dumbrăvioara) – Africa researcher
László Tőkés (Cluj-Napoca) – bishop and politician
Árpád Tóth (Arad) – poet
Sándor Veress (Cluj-Napoca) – pianist and composer
Albert Wass (Răscruci) – writer and poet
Miklós Wesselényi (Jibou) – politician, academician and writer

Serbia

Géza Csáth (Subotica) – writer
Dezső Kosztolányi (Subotica) – poet and writer
Péter Lékó (Subotica) – chess grandmaster
Monica Seles (Novi Sad) – tennis player
John Simon (Subotica) – author; literary, theater and film critic

Slovakia

Gyula Andrássy (Košice) – politician
Gyula Andrássy the Younger (Trebišov) – politician
Bálint Balassi (Zvolen) – poet
Ernő Dohnányi (Bratislava) – conductor, composer and pianist
Abraham Hochmuth (Bánovce nad Bebravou) – rabbi
László Hudec (Banská Bystrica) – architect
Mór Jókai (Komárno) – writer
Lajos Kassák (Nové Zámky) – poet, painter, typographer and graphic artist
Imre Madách (Dolná Strehová) – poet
Sándor Márai (Košice) – writer
Kálmán Mikszáth (Sklabiná) – writer
Szilárd Németh (Komárno) – football player
Ferenc II Rákóczi (Borša) – prince and leader of Hungarian uprising in 1703–11
János Selye (Komárno) – psychologist and researcher
Mihály Tompa (Rimavská Sobota) – poet

Ukraine

Transcarpathia

Mihály Munkácsy (Mukacheve) – painter
Moshe Leib Rabinovich (Mukacheve) – rabbi and scholar

See also

List of Hungarian Americans
List of Hungarian Jews
List of Székelys
Lists of people by nationality
Lists of people by occupation
List of people from Bács-Kiskun
List of people from Budapest
List of University of Szeged people

References

External links
Hungary's Hall of Fame
Hungarian Inventors and Inventions (at the site of the Hungarian Patent Office)
Famous Hungarians